Cleveland Township is one of nine townships in Whitley County, Indiana, United States. As of the 2010 census, its population was 3,398 and it contained 1,441 housing units.

Geography
The Eel River flows westward through the township. The streams of Clear Creek, Spring Creek, Sugar Creek and Sycamore Creek run through this township. Lakes in this township include T Lake.

Cities and towns
 South Whitley

Unincorporated towns
 Collamer at 
 Luther at 
(This list is based on USGS data and may include former settlements.)

Adjacent townships
 Richland Township (north)
 Columbia Township (northeast)
 Washington Township (east)
 Clear Creek Township, Huntington County (southeast)
 Warren Township, Huntington County (south)
 Chester Township, Wabash County (southwest)
 Jackson Township, Kosciusko County (west)
 Monroe Township, Kosciusko County (northwest)

Cemeteries
The township contains one cemetery, Cleveland.

Major highways
  Indiana State Road 5
  Indiana State Road 14
  Indiana State Road 105
  Indiana State Road 205

Airports and landing strips
 Mishler Landing Strip

Education
Cleveland Township residents may obtain a free library card from the South Whitley Community Public Library.

References
 
 United States Census Bureau cartographic boundary files

External links
 Indiana Township Association
 United Township Association of Indiana

Townships in Whitley County, Indiana
Townships in Indiana